Weglein is a surname. Notable people with this surname include:
Arthur Weglein, American seismologist
 (1895–1973), German music educator
David E. Weglein (1876–1950), American educator
 (1894–1977), German-Jewish nurse, survivor of Theresienstadt